Dominykas is a Lithuanian masculine given name, a Lithuanian variant of the name Dominic. People bearing the name Dominykas include:
 Dominykas Domarkas (born 1992), basketball player 
 Dominykas Galkevičius (born 1986), footballer
 Dominykas Jančionis (born 1993), rower
 Dominykas Milka (born 1992), basketball player

References

Masculine given names
Lithuanian masculine given names